is a funicular station in Tateyama, Nakaniikawa District, Toyama Prefecture, Japan.

Lines
Tateyama Kurobe Kankō
Tateyama Cable Car (Tateyama Kurobe Alpine Route)

Adjacent stations

Railway stations in Toyama Prefecture